The 14th European Women's Artistic Gymnastics Championships were held in Gothenburg, Sweden on 7-8 May 1983.

Medalists

Results

All-around

Vault

Uneven bars

Balance beam

Floor

References 

1983
European Artistic Gymnastics Championships
1983 in Swedish women's sport
1980s in Gothenburg
International gymnastics competitions hosted by Sweden
International sports competitions in Gothenburg